Ojo in Oz (1933) is the twenty-seventh in the series of Oz books created by L. Frank Baum and his successors, and the thirteenth written by Ruth Plumly Thompson. It was illustrated by John R. Neill.

Ojo (from The Patchwork Girl of Oz) is captured by Gypsies who plan to turn him over to a mysterious enemy who has offered to pay a large reward to anyone who captures and delivers Ojo to his stronghold at Moojer Mountain. Ojo befriends the gypsies' captive dancing bear Snufferbux (whose full name is Snuffurious, Buxorious, Blundurious Boroso). The gypsies are in turn captured by Realbad, the leader of a gang of bandits, who carries a secret that is connected to the Munchkin boy and his habitually closemouthed guardian Unc Nunkie.  Realbad learns about the reward and resolves to collect it himself by delivering Ojo to Moojer Mountain. Separated from the bandit gang, and hopelessly lost, Ojo and Snufferbux reluctantly agree to travel with Realbad (who is a resourceful survivalist) until they either get to the Emerald City or to Moojer Mountain.  While traveling, they face various dangers together and gradually develop a genuine friendship.

Meanwhile, Dorothy, Scraps, and the Cowardly Lion set out to rescue Ojo, but get lost themselves, and visit Dicksey Land and other strange places.  Everyone is menaced by a fearsome wizard, and Ojo learns who his parents are.

References

External links
 On Ojo in Oz

Oz (franchise) books
1933 American novels
1933 fantasy novels
1933 children's books